Maplelawn is a historic house in Canada.

Maplelawn or Maple Lawn may also refer to:
Maplelawn Farmstead, in Boone County, Indiana
Maple Lawn, Fulton, Maryland, a land development
Maple Lawn, Balmville, New York
Maple Lawn Farm, Newark Valley, New York
Owen-Cox House or Maplelawn, Brentwood, Tennessee